Mehrabad (also Romanized as Mehrābād; also known as Kalāteh-ye Gholāmḩoseyn Khān) is a village in Rezqabad Rural District, in the Central District of Esfarayen County, North Khorasan Province, Iran. At the 2006 census, its population was 572, in 122 families.

References 

Populated places in Esfarayen County